Class Enemy is a 2013 Slovenian drama film directed by Rok Biček. The film was selected as the Slovenian entry for the Best Foreign Language Film at the 86th Academy Awards, but it was not nominated. It was nominated for the 2014 Lux Prize. It won the Fedeora Award at the 28th Venice Critics' Week.

Cast
 Igor Samobor as Robert
 Nataša Barbara Gračner as Zdenka
 Tjaša Železnik as Saša
 Maša Derganc as Nuša
 Robert Prebil as Matjaž
 Voranc Boh as Luka
 Jan Zupančič as Tadej
 Daša Cupevski as Sabina
 Doroteja Nadrah as Mojca
 Špela Novak as Špela
 Pia Korbar as Maruša
 Dan David Mrevlje Natlačen as Primož
 Jan Vrhovnik as Nik
 Kangjing Qiu as Chang
 Estera Dvornik as Sonja
 Peter Teichmeister as janitor

Awards and accolades
Class Enemy was one of three films nominated for the European Parliament LUX Prize in 2014, and received the highest number of votes from audiences across Europe although the prize winner (chosen by a ballot of MEPs) was Ida.

The FEDEORA (Federation of Film Critics of Europe and the Mediterranean) jury awarded Class Enemy its prize for Best Film of the International Critics' Week at Venice in 2013.

At the Festival of Slovenian Film in September 2013, Class Enemy won seven Vesna awards: Best Film, Best Lead Actor (Igor Samobor), Best Supporting Actress (Barbara Gračner), Best Cinematography (Fabio Stoll), Best Costume Design ( Bistra Borak), the audience award, and the critics' award.

At the 2013 International Film Festival of Bratislava, Class Enemy won the Grand Prix, the Audience Award, the Award for Best Actor, and the FIPRESCI Prize.

It also won the FIPRESCI International Film Critics Prize at the Panorama of European Cinema in Athens in November 2013.

See also
 List of submissions to the 86th Academy Awards for Best Foreign Language Film
 List of Slovenian submissions for the Academy Award for Best Foreign Language Film

References

External links
 
 Class Enemy at Cineuropa
 Focus on Razredni Sovražnik (Class Enemy) (European Parliament / LUX Prize)

2013 films
2013 drama films
2010s German-language films
Slovene-language films
Films about education
Films about suicide
Slovenian drama films